Nicolas Birtz (17 March 1922 – 20 March 2006) was a Luxembourgian footballer. He played in one match for the Luxembourg national football team in 1948. Birtz was part of Luxembourg's squad for the football tournament at the 1948 Summer Olympics but he did not play in any matches.

References

External links
 

1922 births
2006 deaths
Luxembourgian footballers
Luxembourg international footballers
Sportspeople from Esch-sur-Alzette
Association football midfielders
Stade Dudelange players